Gymnostomum boreale is a species of moss in the family Pottiaceae. It is endemic to Russia.

References

Pottiaceae
Endemic flora of Russia
Least concern plants
Plants described in 1986
Taxonomy articles created by Polbot